Easthope is a small village and small civil parish in Shropshire, England.

Wenlock Edge passes through the parish, to the northwest of the village, along which is Easthope Wood. A hamlet with the same name (or spelled Easthopewood) is on the other side of the Edge, within the parish.

Easthope gives its name to Easthope Road in the nearby town of Church Stretton, as a result of local property developer Ralph Beaumont Benson (1862–1911), who lived at Lutwyche Hall near the village. He was also responsible for the naming of Essex Road (after his wife, Caroline Essex Cholmondeley), Beaumont Road and Lutwyche Road, all in Church Stretton. He was the father of Stella Benson.

See also
Listed buildings in Easthope

References

Civil parishes in Shropshire
Villages in Shropshire